The Southeastern Loloish languages, also known as Southeastern Ngwi, are a branch of the Loloish languages. In Lama's (2012) classification, it is called Axi-Puoid, which forms the Nisoish branch together with the Nisoid (Nisu–Lope) (Northern Loloish) languages.

Languages
Southeastern Yi is one of the six Yi languages (fangyan 方言) officially recognized by the Chinese government. Sani 撒尼 is the officially recognized literary standard for Southeastern Yi. Pelkey (2011) considers Southern Yi (Nisu 尼苏) to be another officially recognized Yi fangyan 方言 that belongs to Southeastern Loloish.

Pelkey (2011)
Jamin Pelkey (2011) lists the following languages in Southeastern Ngwi (Southeastern Loloish). Four branches of Southeastern Loloish are recognized, namely Nisu, Sani–Azha, Highland Phula, and Riverine Phula.
Nisu: Nyisu?; Northern Nisu, Southern Nisu [+ Lope]
Sani–Azha: Sani, Axi; Azhe; Azha [+ Samei?]
Highland Phula:
Muji:
Core Muji: Northern Muji, Qila Muji, Southern Muji, Bokha–Phuma; Muzi; Laghuu
 Thopho
 Moji
Phowa:
Ani Phowa, Labo Phowa
Hlepho Phowa, Phukha
Khlula, Zokhuo
Riverine Phula:
Upriver: Phola, Alo Phola, Phala
Downriver:
Phupa, Phuza
Phupha, Alugu

Pelkey (2011b) contains a comparative word list of Phola (Upriver Phula), Phuza (Downriver Phula), Muji (Highland Phula), Phowa (Highland Phula), and Azha.

Bradley (2007) had classified Sani, Axi, Azhe, and Azha as forming a Southeastern Central subgroup of Central Loloish, but Pelkey (2011) reclassified them as Southeastern Loloish rather than Central Loloish languages.

Also, Pelkey (2011) notes that Southeastern Ngwi may be most closely related to Northern Ngwi (including Nosu and Nasu), which is in line with Lama's (2012) proposal of a Nisoish clade.

Other languages
Pelkey (2011:353) specifically excludes Pholo, noting that although it has been closely associated with speakers of Southeastern Ngwi languages historically, it does not share the defining features of the branch.

Pelkey (2011) classifies Nyisu of Shilin County as belonging to the Nisu language cluster, but notes that this classification is in need of further formal evidence. Bradley (2007), however, classifies Nyisu of Kunming as being most closely related to Suondi Yi. It is not known whether Nyisu of Kunming and Nyisu of Shilin County are related or not.

Ethnologue classifies Ache as a Southeastern Loloish language. However, Ache has not been analyzed in classifications of Southeastern Loloish by Pelkey (2011) and Lama (2012), and hence remains unclassified within the Southeastern Loloish branch.

Pelkey (2011:431) suggests that the Xiqi, Ati, and Long languages of Huaning County may be Southeastern Loloish languages.

It is uncertain if Zhayipo 扎依颇 of Mile County is a Southeastern Loloish language or not.

Glottolog and ISO 639 (2007) also add the "Nisi (China)" language (code: yso), previously named "Southeastern Lolo Yi", and still unclassified within branches of Southeastern Loloish.

Innovations
Pelkey (2011:356-365) lists the following four mergers from Proto-Ngwi as Southeastern Ngwi innovations.
 Proto-Ngwi * and * > Proto-Southeastern Ngwi * (modern reflexes: tɬ, kɬ, k, t, ɬ, etc. in words such as to load)
 Proto-Ngwi * and * > Proto-Southeastern Ngwi * (modern reflexes: tɬʰ, kɬʰ, kʰ, tʰ, ɬ, etc. in words such as bee, taro, destroy, change, excrement)
 Proto-Ngwi * and * > Proto-Southeastern Ngwi * (modern reflexes: dɮ, ɡɮ, ɡ, d, etc. in words such as silver, face, pus, full, to fly, lightning, four)
 Proto-Ngwi * and * > Proto-Southeastern Ngwi * (modern reflexes: ndɮ, ŋɡɮ, nd, etc.)

Another Southeastern Ngwi lexical innovation is that of ‘bat’, which is compounded from *b-yam¹ (‘to fly’) and *wa² (‘person’), literally meaning ‘flyer’ (Pelkey 2011:375).

Chen (1985)
Chen, et al. (1985) also recognizes a similar group called Southeastern Yi (彝语东南部方言), which includes the following dialects.
Yiliang 宜良土语: spoken in Yiliang (including the Shilin border area), Qiubei, Luxi, Mile, and Luliang counties
Mile 弥勒土语: spoken in Mile, Huaning, Kunming, Luxi, and Yiliang counties
Huami 华弥土语 (Huaning-Mile): spoken in Mile, Huaning, and Jianshui counties
Wenxi 文西土语 (Wenshan-Xichou): spoken in Wenshan, Xichou, Yanshan, Malipo, Maguan, Funing, Guangnan, and Qiubei counties. Internal variation is greatest within the Wenxi lect.

Chen (2010)
In Chen (2010), Southeastern Loloish called Nesu (聂苏方言). Also listed are the counties where each respective dialect is spoken.

Nesu 聂苏方言
Nesu, Nièsū 聂苏次方言
Nesu, Nièsū 聂苏: 500,000 speakers in Honghe, Mojiang, Yuanjiang, Yuanyang, Luchun, Jiangcheng, Jinping, Hekou, Pu'er, Jinghong, Mengla, etc.
Narsu, Nuósū 娜苏: 500,000 speakers in Shiping, Eshan, Tonghai, Jianshui, Kaiyuan, Gejiu, Mengzi, Pingbian, etc.
Zoko, Zuòkuò 作括: 100,000 speakers in Wenshan, Yanshan, Xichou, Maguan, Malipo, etc.
Sani, Sǎní 撒尼次方言
Sani, Sǎní 撒尼: 200,000 speakers in Lunan, Yiliang, Luliang, Mile, Luxi, Shizong, Malong, Luquan, Qiubei, etc.
Asi, Āxì 阿细: 200,000 speakers in Mile, Lunan, Chengjiang, Kunming, Huaning, etc.
Nise, Nísài 尼赛: 100,000 speakers in Lunan
Azi, Āzhé 阿哲次方言
Azi, Āzhé 阿哲: 100,000 speakers in Mile, Huaning, Kaiyuan, Jianshui, etc.
Neshu, Nièshū 聂舒:: 500,000 speakers in Xinping, Yuxi, Jiangchuan, Yimen, Puning, etc.
Lopo, Luópō 罗泼: 100,000 speakers in Mile
Kopo, Gépō 格泼: 100,000 speakers in Fuyuan, Luoping, Zhanyi, Qujing, Shizong, Huize, Lunan, Luliang, Mile, etc.
Sanni, Sāngní 桑尼: 100,000 speakers in Kunming

Demographics
The following demographics of Southeastern Loloish languages are from Pelkey (2011).

The following datapoints (i.e., sample locations) for Phula languages are from Pelkey (2011:26-27).

References

Bradley, David. 1997. "Tibeto-Burman languages and classification". In Tibeto-Burman languages of the Himalayas, Papers in South East Asian linguistics. Canberra: Pacific Linguistics.
Bradley, David. 2002. The subgrouping of Tibeto-Burman. In Medieval Tibeto-Burman languages, Christopher Beckwith and Henk Blezer (eds.), 73–112. (International Association for Tibetan Studies Proceedings 9 (2000) and Brill Tibetan Studies Library 2.) Leiden: Brill.
Bradley, David. 2007. East and Southeast Asia. In Moseley, Christopher (ed.), Encyclopedia of the World's Endangered Languages, 349-424. London & New York: Routledge.
Chen Kang [陈康]. 2010. A study of Yi dialects [彝语方言研究]. Beijing: China Minzu University Press.
Lama, Ziwo Qiu-Fuyuan. 2012. Subgrouping of Nisoic (Yi) Languages. Ph.D. thesis, University of Texas at Arlington.
Pelkey, Jamin. 2011. Dialectology as Dialectic: Interpreting Phula Variation. Berlin: De Gruyter Mouton.
van Driem, George. 2001. Languages of the Himalayas: An Ethnolinguistic Handbook of the Greater Himalayan Region. Leiden: Brill.